Teina Teiti (born April 2, 1983) is a  sprint athlete, who competes for the Cook Islands.

Teiti was just 17 years old when he competed at the 2000 Summer Olympics in the 100 metres he ran in a time off 11.22 seconds and finished 7th in his heat, so didn't qualify for the next round.

References

External links
 

1983 births
Living people
Athletes (track and field) at the 2000 Summer Olympics
Cook Island male sprinters
Olympic athletes of the Cook Islands